Tisagronia pexa is a moth of the family Noctuidae. It is found in the Maule and Magallanes and Antartica Chilena Regions of Chile and Patagonia in Argentina

The wingspan is about 42 mm. Adults are on wing in January

External links
 Noctuinae of Chile

Noctuinae
Fauna of Argentina
Fauna of Chile
Moths of South America
Insects of South America